Bell Brothers was a diversified company with interests in the aggregates, automotive, civil engineering, heavy heads, mining engineering and transport industries. Primarily based in Western Australia, it also had smaller interests in other states of Australia.

History
Bell Brothers was formed in 1937 by brothers David, Robert and Alexander Bell. A mechanical shovel was purchased moving slag and sand for the Perth City Council. During World War II it built airfields at Broome, Derby, Pearce and Port Hedland.

It went on to become one of the largest transport companies in the state. In 1946 it commenced mining coal in Collie. As well as operating trucks that moved goods to and from ships docking at Fremantle, by 1950 it had commenced hauling manganese to Meekatharra and iron ore from Koolyanobbing to Southern Express for onward movement by rail services.

A 64-acre headquarters was established in Guildford in 1952. In 1954 it became a distributor for ERF and Mack Trucks. In the late 1950s it was responsible for the construction of RAAF Base Learmonth briefly operating an Avro Anson aeroplane.

On 9 September 1965 Bell Brothers was listed on the Sydney, Melbourne and Perth stock exchanges. In July 1969, it diversified into aggregates purchasing Swan Quarries which became Bell Basic Industries. In 1972 Western Transport of Queensland was purchased followed by the Queensland Tyre Re-treading Co. In 1973 Bell Brothers was acquired by Robert Holmes à Court's Albany Woollen Mills, becoming part the Bell Group in July 1976.

After the Bell Group was taken over by Bond Corporation and the State Government Insurance Office, Bell Brothers was sold to Boral in 1988. In May 1991 the transport business was sold by Boral to Heytesbury Pty Ltd, the family company of Holmes à Court's widow Janet.

Notes

Auto dealerships of Australia
Building materials companies of Australia
Companies formerly listed on the Australian Securities Exchange
Construction and civil engineering companies established in 1937
Construction and civil engineering companies of Australia
Companies based in Perth, Western Australia
Guildford, Western Australia
Mining engineering companies
Transport companies established in 1937
Transport companies of Australia
Australian companies established in 1937